Ahmadabad-e Malek (also Romanized as Aḩmadābād-e Malek) is a village in Bala Jowayin Rural District, in the Central District of Jowayin County, Razavi Khorasan Province, Iran. At the 2006 census, its population was 708, in 173 families.

See also 

 List of cities, towns and villages in Razavi Khorasan Province

References 

Populated places in Joveyn County